Sir Charles Lloyd Jones (28 May 187830 July 1958) was an Australian businessman and patron of the arts, serving as Chairman of David Jones Limited from 1920 to his death in 1958.

Early life and background
Jones was born in 1878 in Burwood, New South Wales, to Edward Lloyd Jones and Helen Ann Jones, and was grandson to the Welsh-born merchant David Jones. After attending the Manor House School, London, and Homebush Grammar School, Jones studied from 1895 at the Julian Ashton Art School in Sydney and then the Slade School of Fine Art in London, England, but ultimately was unable to fulfil his ambition of becoming a professional artist. He later trained as a tailor and worked in that profession for several years in England before returning to Australia in 1902. On 16 November 1900 when visiting Sydney he married his first wife, Winifred Ethelwyn Quaife, the daughter of Barzillai Quaife (1798-1873), a Congregational and Presbyterian minister, but they had no children.

Career and David Jones
After he returned to Sydney in 1902, Jones worked in the family company David Jones Limited, in the clothing factory before transferring to the advertising department. When David Jones Ltd became a listed as a public company in 1906, he was appointed as a director. In 1920 he succeeded his elder brother, Edward Lloyd Jones, as Chairman, a position he would hold until his death in 1958. During his term, David Jones expanded significantly, opening a second major store in Elizabeth Street in 1927 and later a third on the corner of Market and Castlereagh streets in 1938 to mark the centenary of the company.

As both an artist himself and a patron of the arts in Sydney, Jones established the David Jones Art Gallery in the Elizabeth Street store in 1944, under the direction of Sir John Ashton. The Sir Charles Lloyd Jones Memorial Prize was named in his honour. A promoter of Sydney artists and in particular the work of William Dobell, Dobell painted Jones' portrait in 1951, which is now held in the National Portrait Gallery, Canberra.  In a note to his sons regarding the family company he said: "David Jones is more than a material money-making concern, it is a great institution rendering a service to countless millions in the year, in fair dealing with the desire to serve all who enter its doors honestly, setting a new standard in commercial practice."

He was also publisher of Art in Australia. He was the inaugural Chairman of the Australian Broadcasting Commission 1932-34 and acting chairman of the Australian National Travel Association when in 1934 it launched Walkabout magazine. He was made a Knight Bachelor in the 1951 New Year's Honours.

Notes

External links
 Silas Clifford-Smith, 'Charles Lloyd Jones (Sir)', Dictionary of Australian Artists Online, peer reviewed biography of his art career, 2009
 Shopkeepers and Shoppers, Frances Pollon published 1989 A social history of Retailing in New South Wales from 1788

Chairpersons of the Australian Broadcasting Corporation
Alumni of the Slade School of Fine Art
Australian art patrons
Australian businesspeople in retailing
Australian Knights Bachelor
People from Sydney
1878 births
1958 deaths
20th-century Australian painters
20th-century Australian male artists
Julian Ashton Art School alumni
Australian male painters